The Grand Ducal Burial Vault (Russian: Великокняжеская усыпальница) is the purpose-built mausoleum of the Grand Dukes and Duchesses of Russia in the Peter and Paul Fortress. The Neo-Baroque domed structure is frequently mistaken for a part of the Peter and Paul Cathedral due to architectural similarities. A covered passageway leads from the mausoleum to the cathedral, where the Russian emperors and empresses are buried.

The building was designed by David Grimm in 1896. It was constructed in order to remove the remains of some of the non-reigning Romanovs from the cathedral, where there was scarcely any room for new burials. Antony Tomishko and Leon Benois were responsible for the actual construction work. The interior is richly decorated with marble, mosaics and ormolu. Grand Duke Alexei Alexandrovich of Russia was the first to be interred in the mausoleum in 1908. The bones of eight other royals were brought to the vault from the cathedral. The last prerevolutionary burial, that of Grand Duke Constantine Constantinovich of Russia, took place seven years later. 

The mausoleum was expected to hold up to sixty tombs, but by the time of the Russian Revolution there were only thirteen. The Soviets destroyed the uniform tombs with a view to converting the building into a city history museum; the tombs were later restored. Grand Duke Vladimir Kirillovich was buried in the Grand Ducal Mausoleum in 1992. The remains of his parents, Grand Duke Cyril Vladimirovich and Grand Duchess Viktoria Feodorovna, were transferred from Schloss Rosenau three years later. His wife, Grand Duchess Leonida Georgievna, was buried there in 2010.

References 

Buildings and structures completed in 1908
Burial sites of the House of Holstein-Gottorp-Romanov
Baroque Revival architecture
Mausoleums in Russia
Buildings and structures in Saint Petersburg
Burial sites of the House of Beauharnais
1908 establishments in the Russian Empire
Cultural heritage monuments of federal significance in Saint Petersburg
Peter and Paul Fortress